Drosera sect. Ergaleium is a section of 26 species that are erect or scrambling tuberous plants in the genus Drosera. This section represents a natural group and are taxonomically monophyletic.

The section description has its origins in the description of Drosera subg. Ergaleium, first formally described by Augustin Pyramus de Candolle in 1824. In 1848, Jules Émile Planchon reorganized the species into sections, series, and subseries. Ludwig Diels reclassified the genus in his 1906 monograph of the family, placing the erect and scrambling tuberous Drosera in section Polypeltes. Another reclassification occurred in 1977, when Larry Eugene DeBuhr corrected Diels' section name to the correct and older autonym, sect. Ergaleium.

Taxa 

Drosera andersoniana W.Fitzg. ex Ewart & Jean White
Drosera bicolor Lowrie & Carlquist
Drosera bulbigena Morrison
Drosera erythrogyne N.G.Marchant & Lowrie
Drosera gigantea Lindl.
D. gigantea subsp. geniculata N.G.Marchant & Lowrie
D. gigantea subsp. gigantea Lindl.
Drosera graniticola N.G.Marchant
Drosera heterophylla Lindl.
Drosera huegelii Endl.
Drosera intricata Planch.
Drosera macrantha Endl.
D. macrantha subsp. eremaea N.G.Marchant & Lowrie
D. macrantha subsp. macrantha Endl.
Drosera marchantii DeBuhr
D. marchantii subsp. marchantii DeBuhr
D. marchantii subsp. prophylla N.G.Marchant & Lowrie
Drosera menziesii R.Br. ex DC.
D. menziesii subsp. basifolia N.G.Marchant & Lowrie
D. menziesii subsp. menziesii R.Br. ex DC.
D. menziesii subsp. penicillaris (Benth.) N.G.Marchant & Lowrie
D. menziesii subsp. thysanosepala (Diels) N.G.Marchant
Drosera microphylla Endl.
Drosera modesta Diels
Drosera moorei (Diels) Lowrie
Drosera myriantha Planch.
Drosera neesii Lehm.
D. neesii subsp. borealis N.G.Marchant
D. neesii subsp. neesii Lehm.
Drosera pallida Lindl.
Drosera peltata Thunb.
D. peltata subsp. auriculata (Backh. ex Planch.) B.J.Conn
D. peltata subsp. peltata Thunb.
Drosera radicans N.G.Marchant
Drosera salina N.G.Marchant & Lowrie
Drosera stricticaulis (Diels) O.H.Sarg.
Drosera subhirtella Planch.
Drosera subtilis N.G.Marchant
Drosera sulphurea Lehm.
Drosera zigzagia Lowrie

See also 
List of Drosera species

References 

Drosera
Plant sections